This is a list of Polish television related events from 2002.

Events
6 January - The Polish version of Pop Idol debuts on Polsat.
26 May - Piotr Borucki wins series 3 of Big Brother.
30 June - Alicja Janosz wins the first series of Idol.

Debuts

Domestic
6 January - Idol (2002-2005)

International

Television shows

1990s
Klan (1997-present)

2000s
M jak miłość (2000-present)

Ending this year
Big Brother (2001-2002, 2007-2008)

Births

Deaths